M. E. Lionel Fernando is a former civil servant and Diplomat. He has held the offices of Secretary to the Ministry of Media, Tourism and Aviation, Secretary to the Foreign Ministry, Sri Lankan Ambassador to the Netherlands, Sri Lankan Ambassador to France, Governor of North Eastern Province.

Fernando has also been Secretary to the Ministry of Civil Defence and Commissioner General of Rehabilitation and Essential Services. He was also the chairman of the Executive Council of the Organization for the Prohibition of the Chemical Weapons (OPCW) associated to the UNO, and Chairperson Sri Lanka Rupavahini Corporation.

References

External links

Governors of the Northern Provincial Council - History of Governors
I wanted to be among the people, and work for them - Lionel Fernando

|-

|-

Living people
Governors of North Eastern Province, Sri Lanka
Ambassadors of Sri Lanka to France
Ambassadors of Sri Lanka to the Netherlands
Deshabandu
Year of birth missing (living people)